Iznájar is a town and municipal area in the province of Córdoba in Andalucia, southern Spain.

The municipality covers an area of 136 km2 and in 2005 had a population of 4,960 inhabitants, with a population density of 36.5 people per km2.

The village itself is situated on top of a huge rocky outcropping overlooking the Embalse de Iznájar, the largest reservoir in the whole of Andalucía, which is frequented throughout the warm season as a beach.

The principal economic activity of the area is the cultivation of olives although tourism is increasingly becoming an economic factor.

Iznájar is a classic "pueblo blanco", or white village and is surrounded by its "Aldeas" - sub villages including La Celada, El Higueral, Solerche to name but three.

There are many places to stay, from hotels through to bed & breakfasts to houses or apartments to rent.  The whole of the area of Iznájar has a vibrant social life with many fiestas celebrated throughout the year - most notably Semana Santa (Easter), Los Reyes (Three Kings or Twelfth Night) and the Fiesta de la Virgen.

External links 

Iznájar - Andalucian government's statistical information website

Municipalities in the Province of Córdoba (Spain)